Pascal Tokodi (born 21 April 1993), officially known as Pascalino Lpesinoi Lenguro Tokodi, is a Kenyan musician, actor, comedian and songwriter. Pascal debuted as a professional actor in 2012 when he featured in Citizen Tv's Makutano Junction gig, a few months after completing high school, taking the role of Thomas. His music debut was in 2016, with singles, "Sitaki" and "Mama".

He appeared in shows such as Groove Theory (Africa's first TV Musical drama), Pray and Prey, Machachari and Wrath and Selina (2018). He won the Best Supporting Actor in a Movie or TV Series at the 2020 Africa Magic Viewers' Choice Awards for his role in the Nollywood film, 'Disconnect.'

Personal life 
Pascal got married in a private ceremony to a Kenyan Tv host and  gospel singer, Grace Ekirapa in 2020.

Career

In 2012, Tokodi joined professional acting after featuring in the Citizen TV's Makutano Junction, a Kenyan soap opera that premiered in 2006.

In 2013, Tokodi acted in Kenya's first Musical TV Drama Series, Groove Theory, taking the role of Guy, a member of the prestigious Victoria University Campus Choir.

In 2014, Tokodi featured in Pray & Prey, a Kenyan dramedy.

In 2015, he featured in Fox Africa's Wrath.

In 2016, he released his first single, "Sitaki", after participating in the Tecno Own The Stage competition.

In 2017, he released more songs and collaborations. Among them were Hii si Kwaheri ft friends of CEEL, Forget ft King Kaka (rapper)|, Milele ft King Kaka (rapper), Asante Mama ft Rapper Phill, African Lady and Songa.

In 2018, he featured in the Maisha Magic East's riveting Swahili Telenovela dubbed Selina, where he played Nelson.

Singles
 "Sitaki" – 2016
 "Hii si Kwaheri ft friends of CEEL"- 2017
 "Forget ft King Kaka(rapper)" – 2017
 "Milele ft King Kaka(rapper)" – 2017
 "African Lady" – 2017
 "Asante Mama ft Rapper Phill" – 2017
 "Songa" – 2017
 "Naito" - 2020

Awards and nominations
 He came second runner-up in the Tecno Own the Stage competition where he won one million Kenyan Shillings.
 He was the best actor, three years in a row in Kenya.
 He was awarded the best supporting actor at the AMVCA 7th edition in 2020.

References

1993 births
Living people
Musicians from Nairobi
Kenyan male film actors
Kenyan male television actors
21st-century Kenyan male actors